Maureen Birnbaum, Barbarian Swordsperson is a 1993 anthology by George Alec Effinger, collecting all of his stories (up to 1993) about Maureen "Muffy" Birnbaum, a Jewish-American princess who is magically teleported to various fantasy and science fiction universes, and later recounts the tales to her best friend, "Bitsy" Spiegelman. Originally written on his own initiative, the character proved popular enough for Effinger to gain several requests from authors to have versions of their work visited by Muffy.

In addition to satirizing and spoofing the various themes, the stories had a feminist undertone, as Maureen dealt with the often sexist reactions of the inhabitants of the worlds she met, struggled to find the Martian prince she had fallen in love with, and contrasted her adventures with the life of Bitsy, a housewife with an increasingly unhappy marriage.

The anthology had two editions:
 Swan Press trade paper (June 1993) cover and interior illustrations by Peggy Ranson.
 Guild America/SFBC hardcover (Aug. 1994) cover and interior illustrations by Ken Kelly.
 The hardcover reused the trade paper’s copyright page (i.e. date and illustration credit). The hardcover's jacket has the correct credit, and the correct date was advertised in Locus magazine.

Contents

Other stories
"Maureen Birnbaum on a Hot Tin Roof" (1994)
 South from Midnight (1994), anthology edited by Richard Gilliam, Martin H. Greenberg, & Thomas R. Hanlon
 Fantasy & Science Fiction (August 1996), edited by Kristine Kathryn Rusch

"Maureen Birnbaum in the MUD" (1995)
 Chicks in Chainmail (1995), anthology edited by Esther Friesner
 Chicks Ahoy (2010), anthology edited by Esther Friesner

"Maureen Birnbaum Pokes an Eye Out" (1996)
 Don't Forget Your Spacesuit, Dear (1996), anthology edited by Jody Lynn Nye

References 

Science fiction short story collections
Feminist science fiction
Birnbaum, Maureen
Birnbaum, Maureen
1993 short story collections
Adaptations of works by Edgar Rice Burroughs
Pellucidar
Modern Arthurian fiction
Cthulhu Mythos anthologies
Short stories set on the Moon